"I Don't Wanna Get Hurt" is the second single from the album Another Place and Time by Donna Summer. The song was remixed from the album version and released on May 15, 1989, by Warner Bros. Records (Europe).

During recording, Summer expressed concerns that the track was not mature enough for her, and might better suit a much younger singer. However she agreed to defer to the judgement of her writing and production team, Stock Aitken & Waterman (SAW), due to their massive international chart success at the time.

The singer declined to film a video for the single, which went ahead without her, and confessed she found it difficult to participate in promotional duties for the track. Despite her limited involvement in promo, the song became a UK Top 10 hit. 

The decision to significantly remix the track for single release, "to impress Atlantic Records", caused controversy within SAW's production house, with both Mike Stock and original mixer Pete Hammond denouncing the single mix as inferior to the album cut. Summer was reported to particularly dislike the novelty pitched vocal effect that was added to the mix.

In the wake of this discord, the track was never released as a single in the US.

Critical reception
Pop Rescue gave a positive review, stating that "I Don't Wanna Get Hurt" "opens with chugging bass and roaring pop guitars before Donna Summer's crisp vocals arrive. Her voice is flawless and wonderfully suited to this song. It bounces along perfectly, and is incredibly pop and catchy".

The Record Mirror said, "Brilliant intro. So good I was already jotting down 'tack-pop single of the year' until the Kylie Minogue production landed with a thump. Imagine jumping for joy and discovering the ceiling's inches above your head."

Track listings
7-inch single
 "I Don't Wanna Get Hurt" – 3:32
 "I Don't Wanna Get Hurt" (instrumental) – 4:45

12-inch maxi
 "I Don't Wanna Get Hurt" (extended version) – 6:58
 "I Don't Wanna Get Hurt" (instrumental) – 4:45
 "Dinner with Gershwin" – 4:38

CD maxi
 "I Don't Wanna Get Hurt" – 3:34
 "Dinner with Gershwin" – 4:37
 "I Don't Wanna Get Hurt" (instrumental) – 4:47

Credits and personnel
 Backing vocals – Dee Lewis, Mae McKenna, Mike Stock
 Drums – A. Linn
 Guitar – Matt Aitken
 Keyboards – George De Angelis, Matt Aitken, Mike Stock
 Mixing – Mixmaster Phil Harding
 Engineer – Karen Hewitt, Yoyo
 Recorded at PWL
 Producer – Stock Aitken Waterman
 Hair – Andrene at Vidal Sassoon
 Styling – Kelly Cooper
 Photography – Lawrence Lawry
 Design – ADC Production

Charts

References

Donna Summer songs
1989 songs
Song recordings produced by Stock Aitken Waterman
Songs written by Mike Stock (musician)
Songs written by Matt Aitken
Songs written by Pete Waterman
Dance-pop songs
Warner Records singles
1989 singles